Jean Bogaerts (19 January 1925 – 28 January 2017) was a Belgian professional racing cyclist. He won the Omloop Het Nieuwsblad in 1945 and 1951.

References

External links
 

1925 births
2017 deaths
Belgian male cyclists
People from Vilvoorde
Cyclists from Flemish Brabant
20th-century Belgian people